Re Enzo (King Enzo) is an opera in three acts by Ottorino Respighi to a libretto by Alberto Donini (a student friend of Respighi). The singers were amateurs selected in the world of the Bolognese students; among them, Rosina Giovannoni Zacchi as Lauretta and Ernesto Lavarello as Leonzio. Following the will of the composer, there was a single performance, which obtained a good success.

Re Enzo is organized as an operetta, with a succession of musical pieces and dialogues.

In modern times, Re Enzo was revived in September 2004 at the Teatro Comunale di Bologna, with Cristiano Cremonini (Re Enzo), Yoon Bin Jung (Lauretta), Filomena Pericoli (Isabella), Giuseppe di Paola (Podestà) and Maurizio Amadori (Gigione). The performance, conducted by Luigi Pagliarini, was presented as a collaboration between various institutions of the city of Bologna (Conservatory, Academy of Arts and University).

Roles

Instrumentation
Re Enzo is scored for the following instruments:

2 piccolos, oboes, clarinets, bassoons, 2 horns, 2 trumpets, 3 trombones, timpani, triangle, bells, cymbals, bass drum, harp, strings.

On stage: band, trumpets, harps, mandolins.

Synopsis
Place: Bologna
Time: Second half of the 13th century
The story is centered around the figure of Re Enzo, King of Sardinia, captured by the army of Bologna during the battle of Fossalta and held prisoner in the palace later named after him. All women of the city, due to his extreme beauty, fall in love with Enzo and would like to free him. This brings about a conflict with their husbands.

References

Operas
Italian-language operas
1905 operas
Operas by Ottorino Respighi
Operas set in Italy
Operas set in the 13th century
Cultural depictions of Italian men
Cultural depictions of kings
Cultural depictions of poets